Danesford is a small settlement in Shropshire, England. It is on the A442 road and is to the southeast of the town of Bridgnorth. The population as of the 2011 census is listed under the town of Bridgnorth

See also
Listed buildings in Bridgnorth

External links

Hamlets in Shropshire
Bridgnorth